The 1922 New Mexico Lobos football team represented the University of New Mexico as an independent during the 1922 college football season. In their third season under head coach Roy W. Johnson, the Lobos compiled a 3–4 record.

John Richard Popejoy was the team captain. Ogle Jones played halfback for the team. Jones was recognized in 1949 as "the greatest football player who ever performed for the honor and glory of the University of New Mexico."

Schedule

References

New Mexico
New Mexico Lobos football seasons
New Mexico Lobos football